List of the Slovenian number-one singles of 2014 compiled by SloTop50, is the official chart provider of Slovenia. SloTop50 publishes weekly charts once a week, every Sunday. Chart contain data generated by the SloTop50 system according to any song played during the period starting the previous Monday morning at time 00:00:00 and ending Sunday night at 23:59:59.

Charts

Number-one singles by week 
Weekly charted #1 songs and highest charted counting among domestic songs only

Number-one singles by month 
Monthly charted #1 songs and highest charted counting among domestic songs only

References 

Number-one hits
Slovenia
Lists of number-one songs in Slovenia